Tuidraki Samusamuvodre (born 16 February 1998) is a Fijian rugby union player, currently playing for the . His preferred position is fly-half, wing or fullback.

Professional career
Samusamuvodre was named in the Fijian Drua squad for the 2022 Super Rugby Pacific season. He previously represented the New England Free Jacks in the 2021 Major League Rugby season.

References

External links
itsrugby.co.uk Profile

1998 births
Living people
Fijian rugby union players
Rugby union fly-halves
Rugby union wings
Rugby union fullbacks
New England Free Jacks players
Fijian Drua players